Kenneth Robert Sears (August 17, 1933 – April 23, 2017) was an American professional basketball player in the National Basketball Association (NBA). He was the first basketball player on the cover of Sports Illustrated magazine, appearing on the December 20, 1954, issue during his senior season in college.

Born and raised in Watsonville, California, Sears graduated from its high school in 1951 and played college basketball at nearby Santa Clara University. As a freshman, Sears led the Broncos to the final four (semifinals) of the NCAA tournament in 1952, held in Seattle.

A  forward, Sears was a first round selection of the New York Knicks in the 1955 NBA draft and played eight seasons (1955–1961, 1962–1964) in the NBA with the Knicks and San Francisco Warriors. Sears also led the NBA in field goal percentage in consecutive years (1959, 1960).

Sears spent the 1961–62 season with the San Francisco Saints in the short-lived American Basketball League (ABL).

NBA career statistics

Regular season

Playoffs

References

1933 births
2017 deaths
All-American college men's basketball players
Amateur Athletic Union men's basketball players
American men's basketball players
Basketball players from California
National Basketball Association All-Stars
New York Knicks draft picks
New York Knicks players
People from Watsonville, California
Power forwards (basketball)
Rochester Royals draft picks
San Francisco Saints players
San Francisco Warriors players
Santa Clara Broncos men's basketball players
Small forwards